Constantine Vasiliades (born 9 April 1985) is a Cypriot male weightlifter, competing in the 69 kg category and representing Cyprus at international competitions. He competed at world championships, most recently at the 2007 World Weightlifting Championships. He participated at the 2010 Commonwealth Games in the 69 kg event.

Major competitions

References

Further reading
 Weightlifting ACT Facts
 AWF Stats
 2007 World Weightlifting under 69 kg (men)
 Weightlifting Queensland (2010)  
 2007 Royal World Weightlifting Championships 
 Melbourne 2006 Weightlifting Official Results 
 Dossier de presse 2011

External links
 
 

1985 births
Living people
Cypriot male weightlifters
Place of birth missing (living people)
Weightlifters at the 2010 Commonwealth Games
Commonwealth Games competitors for Cyprus